The Anchorage is an historic house located in Northumberland County, seven miles (NE) outside of Kilmarnock, Virginia, near Wicomico Church, Virginia.

The house was built before 1749 as a -story home with a gambrel roof, whose original section is still lived in. It was extended in 1855, including basement foundation. An annex building of 1.5 rooms which was thought to have been built in the mid-18th century, was moved and attached to the house in the 1955.  New evidence has been discovered that the Annex may have actually been built over 100 years earlier as a  stand-alone dwelling.

The original section of the house was then extended in the rear in the mid-1980s. In 2016 and 2017, the house went through a major renovation with additional extensions added. There are six fireplaces, three of which are part of the original chimney.

Since its Land Grant in 1658, the plantation has only had a handful of owners. The current owners, The Byrne family, are on the 3rd generation, having owned the property since 1929–30. The dock is in Kent Cove, which runs about 300 yards off of the Creek. At the entrance of the woods is the Kent family cemetery which dates back through the Civil War, inclusive of a CSA (Confederate States Army) memorial tombstone and grave.

The barn lot has a corn crib and additional barns dating back to the 1840s. The property which was originally a tobacco farm, is in Ball's Neck in the Northern Neck of Virginia, rich in early colonial history. Mary Ball Washington was born a few miles away in Lively, and Richard Lee I ("The Immigrant" was Robert E. Lee's GGG Grandfather and GG-Grandfather of two signers of the Declaration of Independence, as well as GGG=Grandfather of President Zachary Taylor). He emigrated from England in 1639 and had a large tobacco plantation ("Ditchley") of about 2,600 acres on property approaching The Anchorage.

It was registered as a historic landmark by the Virginia Landmarks Register (Virginia Department of Historic Resources) in Virginia by the Byrne Family in 1995.  It also appears on the National Register of Historic Places.

A second dendrochronological study is being commissioned in order to help prove the age of the original dwelling(s) on the property back to the 1690s. Currently, historic records prove a dwelling on the property in 1702.

Gallery

References

External links

Houses on the National Register of Historic Places in Virginia
Colonial Revival architecture in Virginia
Houses in Northumberland County, Virginia
Plantation houses in Virginia
Georgian architecture in Virginia
National Register of Historic Places in Northumberland County, Virginia